Kushneria sinocarnis is a Gram-negative, aerobic and moderately halophilic bacterium from the genus of Kushneria which has been isolated from traditional cured meat in Wuhan.

References

Oceanospirillales
Bacteria described in 2010